Kapsiya is situated 13 km away from Madhubani District in Bihar State, India. It is one of the well known village in Madhubani District. It belongs in Benipatti Block. Kapsiya is part of the Benipatti Vidhan Sabha electoral constituency. The local language is Maithili.

Geography

Nearby places include: Loha, Pokhrauni, Saurath Sabha.

References
 http://madhubani.bih.nic.in

Villages in Madhubani district